The 1997–98 Southern Football League season was the 95th in the history of the league, an English football competition.

Forest Green Rovers won the Premier Division at the first attempt and earned promotion to the Football Conference for the first time in their history. Sittingbourne, Ashford Town (Kent) and St. Leonards Stamcroft were relegated to the Midland and Southern Divisions, whilst Bromsgrove Rovers were reprieved after the Southern Division runners-up Chelmsford City were denied in promotion due to ground grading. Ilkeston Town, Grantham Town and Weymouth were promoted to the Premier Division, the former two as champions.

No clubs were relegated to level eight leagues this season, though Southern Division clubs Trowbridge Town folded and Fareham Town voluntary demoted to the Wessex League.

Premier Division
The Premier Division consisted of 22 clubs, including 16 clubs from the previous season and six new clubs:
Two clubs promoted from the Midland Division:
Rothwell Town
Tamworth

Two clubs promoted from the Southern Division:
Forest Green Rovers
St. Leonards Stamcroft

Two clubs relegated from the Football Conference:
Bath City 
Bromsgrove Rovers

League table

Midland Division
The Midland Division consisted of 21 clubs, including 18 clubs from the previous season and three new clubs:
Blakenall, promoted from the Midland Alliance
Brackley Town, promoted from the Hellenic League
Wisbech Town, promoted from the Eastern Counties League

Also, at the end of the previous season Hinckley Town merged with Midland Alliance club Hinckley Athletic to form Hinckley United.

League table

Southern Division
The Southern Division consisted of 22 clubs, including 19 clubs from the previous season and three new clubs, relegated from the Premier Division:
Baldock Town
Chelmsford City
Newport

At the end of the season Havant Town and Waterlooville merged to form a new club Havant & Waterlooville.

League table

See also
Southern Football League
1997–98 Isthmian League
1997–98 Northern Premier League

References

Southern Football League seasons
6